The 2011 Visa-Bikar was the 52nd season of the Icelandic national football cup. It began on 30 April 2011 and ended with the final in August 2011 at Laugardalsvöllur. FH were the reigning champions, having won their second Icelandic cup last year.

KR won the cup after beating Þór 2-0 in the final. As KR also won the league, they qualified for the 2012–13 UEFA Champions League and Þór will enter the first qualifying round of UEFA Europa League as losing cup finalists.

First round
The First Round consisted of 33 teams from the lower Icelandic levels and five clubs from the 2. deild karla. The matches were played between 30 April and 4 May 2011.

|colspan="3" style="background-color:#97DEFF"|30 April 2011

|-
|colspan="3" style="background-color:#97DEFF"|1 May 2011

|-
|colspan="3" style="background-color:#97DEFF"|2 May 2011

|-
|colspan="3" style="background-color:#97DEFF"|3 May 2011

|-
|colspan="3" style="background-color:#97DEFF"|4 May 2011

|}

1Original score 3–4. Later awarded 3–0.

Second round
The Second Round included the 19 winners from the previous round as well as 2 clubs from the lower Icelandic levels, 7 clubs from the 2. deild karla and all 12 clubs from the 1. deild karla. The matches were played on 8, 9 and 18 May 2011.

|colspan="3" style="background-color:#97DEFF"|8 May 2011

|-
|colspan="3" style="background-color:#97DEFF"|9 May 2011

|-
|colspan="3" style="background-color:#97DEFF"|18 May 2011

|}

Third round
The Third round included the 20 winners from the previous round and the 12 clubs from the Úrvalsdeild. These matches were played between 24 and 26 May 2011.

Fourth round
This round consisted of the 16 winners of the previous round. These matches were played on 20, 21 and 23 June 2011.

Quarter-finals
This round consisted of the 8 winners of the previous round. These matches were played on 2 and 3 July 2011.

Semi-finals
The semi-final matches involve the four winners from the previous quarter-final round on 28 July 2011.

Final
The final took place at Laugardalsvöllur on 13 August 2011 and was contested between the winners of the previous semi-final matches.

External links
 Official site 

2011 in Icelandic football
2011 domestic association football cups
2011